Marta Aleksandrovna Sirotkina (born 22 March 1991) is a former Russian tennis player. Her career-high singles ranking is world No. 115, which she reached on 25 February 2013. In doubles, she reached No. 141 in February 2013.

Career highlights
Apart from professional success on the ITF Circuit (in her career she won 12 singles and 12 doubles titles), Sirotkina won bronze medals in the Moscow Winter Championships (singles and doubles) in 2009, later winning a gold medal in the Russian Championships. She also won silver medals in the Moscow Championships and gold in the "Cup of Russia" doubles tournament.

2011
Sirotkina won three ITF titles in singles in 2011, two $10k tournaments in Bath, Somerset, and Antalya, Turkey, and a $25k tournament in Bangkok, Thailand.

She began 2011 with a bang in Bath, beating the top seed on way to capturing the Aegon Pro Series $10k title, while in the $25k event the following week she beat two higher ranked players to make the main draw where she destroyed former world top-20 star Anna-Lena Grönefeld before falling in the quarterfinals to Claire Feuerstein.

Sirotkina competed in the $25k Foxhills event on 11 July 2011, seeded fifth. Sirotkina defeated Daneika Borthwick in the first round and Samantha Murray in the second round. In the quarterfinals, she was defeated by the first seed, Vitalia Diatchenko.

She participated in the Tatarstan Open in singles and in doubles. Ksenia Lykina was her doubles partner. In the first round of the singles, Sirotkina defeated Valeria Solovyeva. In the second round, she lost to the third seed, Anastasiya Yakimova. In the doubles, she and Lykina lost to the second seeds, Ekaterina Ivanova and Andreja Klepač, in the semifinals, after defeating the fourth seeds, Tetyana Arefyeva and Eugeniya Pashkova in the first round and Natela Dzalamidze and Mandy Minella in the quarterfinals.

Sirotkina competed in the 2011 Summer Universiade in both singles and doubles. In singles, she lost in the third round to eventual bronze-medalist Yoo Mi. Sirotkina partnered with Ksenia Lykina in the doubles and they won a bronze medal.

She competed in the singles qualifying of the Tashkent Open, seeded No. 4, and defeated Viktoriya Karmenova, and in the second round Lyudmyla Kichenok. In the final round, she lost to Aleksandra Krunić.

Personal life
Marta completed her studies at the Moscow Institute for Sports and Fitness Studies. She was funded by a sports-academic scholarship from the Yeltsin Fund. As well as her native Russian she speaks English and Spanish, having attended the Spanish Immersion High School in Moscow. She has one older brother, and she likes playing on hardcourt surfaces but her favourite surface is grass.

In October 2010, Hiberno International and Marta signed a long term management agreement which saw Marta undergo an intensive training camp in the Republic of Ireland at the Tennis Ireland BNP-Paribas National Academy in Dublin under the guidance of her manager Alan Moore and the Internationally respected Garry Cahill (former Ireland Fed Cup team captain and former Ireland Davis Cup team captain).

She lives in London with her partner, former Junior US Open champion Oliver Golding.

ITF finals

Singles: 20 (12 titles, 8 runner-ups)

Doubles: 17 (12 titles, 5 runner-ups)

References

External links
 
 
 

1991 births
Living people
Russian female tennis players
Universiade medalists in tennis
Tennis players from Moscow
Universiade bronze medalists for Russia
Medalists at the 2011 Summer Universiade